John Wakering (or Wakeryng; died 9 April 1425) was a medieval Bishop of Norwich.

Wakering was appointed Archdeacon of Canterbury from 1408, resigning in 1415.

Wakering was named Lord Privy Seal in June 1415 and dismissed from that office in July 1416.

Wakering was elected Bishop of Norwich about 24 November 1415 and was consecrated on 31 May 1416. He died on 9 April 1425.

Citations

References

External links

Bishops of Norwich
Archdeacons of Canterbury
Lords Privy Seal
1425 deaths
Masters of the Rolls
15th-century English Roman Catholic bishops
Year of birth unknown